Plus (stylised as +Plus) is a Japanese pop boy band formed in December 2009 that has been signed to the label, Pony Canyon. The band combines  in its pop tunes elements of genres such as hip hop, reggae, and R&B.

They released their debut album Canvas in 2010. They are well known for singing the opening and ending themes for popular anime such as Fairy Tail and Reborn!

Members

Current

  — vocals and guitar
  — vocals

Former
  — vocals and bass
  — vocals

Discography

Studio albums

Singles

References

External links
+Plus website

Japanese boy bands
Japanese pop music groups
Musical groups established in 2009
Musical groups from Tokyo
Anime musical groups